K. R. Mohanan (11 December 1947 – 25 June 2017) born at thiruvathra Chavakadu Thrissur was a Malayalam film director best known for his critically acclaimed works, Ashwathama (1978), Purushartham (1987) and Swaroopam (1992). He studied at the Pune Film Institute. Mohanan was the Chairman of Kerala State Chalachitra Academy from 2006 to 2011 and the Director of International Film Festival of Kerala. He died of serious illness on June 25, 2017, aged 69.

Filmography 
Ashwathama (1978)
Purushartham (1987)
Swaroopam (1992)
Visudhavanangal (1994) (documentary)

Awards 
 National Film Awards
 1987: Best Feature Film in Malayalam – Purushartham
 1989: Special Jury Award / Special Mention (Non-Feature Film) – Kalamandalam Krishnankutty Poduval
 1992: Best Feature Film in Malayalam – Swaroopam

 Kerala State Film Awards
 1978: Best Film – Ashwathama
 1987: Best Film – Purushartham
 1994: Best Documentary – Visudhavanangal

 Kerala Film Critics Association Award
 1987: Best Film – Purushartham
 1987: Special Jury Award for Direction – Purushartham

References

External links

1947 births
2017 deaths
Film directors from Kerala
Malayalam film directors
Film and Television Institute of India alumni
20th-century Indian film directors
People from Thrissur district